Pruské is a village and municipality in Ilava District in the Trenčín Region of north-western Slovakia.

History
In historical records the village was first mentioned in 1224.

Geography
The municipality lies at an altitude of 252 metres and covers an area of 12.926 km². It has a population of about 2,088 people.

References

External links

  Official page

Villages and municipalities in Ilava District